Olivia van Rooijen (born 29 October 1988) is a Dutch rower. She won a bronze medal at the 2011 World Championships and two silver medals at the European championships in 2015–2016. She placed sixth in the women's eight at the 2016 Summer Olympics. Van Rooijen took up rowing in 2001. She has a degree in chemistry from University of Amsterdam.

References

External links
 

1988 births
Living people
Dutch female rowers
Olympic rowers of the Netherlands
Rowers at the 2016 Summer Olympics
Rowers at the 2020 Summer Olympics
Rowers from Amsterdam
World Rowing Championships medalists for the Netherlands
20th-century Dutch women
20th-century Dutch people
21st-century Dutch women